The southern grey-headed sparrow (Passer diffusus) is a passerine bird of the sparrow family Passeridae. It is sometimes treated as a subspecies of the grey-headed sparrow. It is found in savanna and woodland in Angola and Zambia southwards into South Africa, where it is expanding its range and is kept as a caged bird, like its relative the white-rumped seedeater.

References

External links 

Southern Grey-headed Sparrow at the Internet Bird Collection
Southern Grey-headed Sparrow species text in The Atlas of Southern African Birds

southern grey-headed sparrow
Birds of Southern Africa
Birds described in 1836